Aleyna Tilki (born March 28, 2000) is a Turkish singer and songwriter.

Life and career 

Tilki was born in Konya, on March 28, 2000. Her father is from Konya. Her paternal family is of Turkıc descent who immigrated from Russia. Her mother is from Of, Trabzon. 

At the age of fourteen, she was a semi-finalist on the sixth season of Yetenek Sizsiniz Türkiye (Turkish version of the Got Talent series). She caught public attention because of her Gesi Bağları cover on the show. She achieved national recognition after the release of her song "Cevapsız Çınlama" along with its music video, which has more than 490 million views on YouTube. It is considered the most viewed Turkish music video on YouTube. The song went up to No. 2 on the Turkey's Trending List. Aleyna Tilki released her first solo single "Sen Olsan Bari" in July 2017 which became number 1 in Turkey's charts. The music video currently has over 440 million views on YouTube.

Tilki temporarily left Turkey to complete English language training and settled in Los Angeles in November 2017. In November 2019, it was announced that she was in negotiations with Warner Music for producing a new album and four singles. This would make her the first Turkish singer ever to work with this company. 

In 2020, She agreed on a series of projects on the digital platform Exxen, owned by Acun Ilıcalı. The series shares the similar name as her song "İşte Bu Benim Masalım".

Discography

Non-album singles

Soundtracks

As featured artist

Remix

Filmography 
Television

Commercials
 Fuse Tea (2018)
 Loft (2018)
 Cornetto (2019, 2020)
 Dimes (2021)
 Puma (2022)

Awards and nomination

References

External links
 

2000 births
Living people
People from Konya
Turkish people of Circassian descent
Turkish people of Russian descent
Turkish Muslims
Turkish pop singers
Turkish-language singers
21st-century Turkish singers
Child pop musicians
21st-century Turkish women singers
Golden Butterfly Award winners
Turkish lyricists